Atlantic herring (Clupea harengus) is a herring in the family Clupeidae. It is one of the most abundant fish species in the world. Atlantic herrings can be found on both sides of the Atlantic Ocean, congregating in large schools. They feed on copepods, krill and small fish, while their natural predators are seals, whales, cod and other larger fish.

The Atlantic herring fishery has long been an important part of the economy of New England and the Canadian Atlantic provinces. This is because the fish congregate relatively near to the coast in massive schools, notably in the cold waters of the semi-enclosed Gulf of Maine and Gulf of St. Lawrence.

Description
Atlantic herring have a fusiform body. Gill rakers in their mouths filter incoming water, trapping any zooplankton and phytoplankton.

Atlantic herring are in general fragile. They have large and delicate gill surfaces, and contact with foreign matter can strip away their large scales.

They have retreated from many estuaries worldwide due to excess water pollution although in some estuaries that have been cleaned up, herring have returned. The presence of their larvae indicates cleaner and more–oxygenated waters.

Range and habitat
Atlantic herring can be found on both sides of the Atlantic Ocean. They range, shoaling and schooling across North Atlantic waters such as the Gulf of Maine, the Gulf of St Lawrence, the Bay of Fundy, the Labrador Sea, the Davis Straits, the Beaufort Sea, the Denmark Strait, the Norwegian Sea, the North Sea, the Skagerrak, the English Channel, the Celtic Sea, the Irish Sea, the Bay of Biscay and Sea of the Hebrides. Although Atlantic herring are found in the northern waters surrounding the Arctic, they are not considered to be an Arctic species.

Baltic herring

The small-sized herring in the inner parts of the Baltic Sea, which is also less fatty than the true Atlantic herring (Clupea harengus harengus), is considered a distinct subspecies, "Baltic herring" (Clupea harengus membras), despite the lack of a distinctive genome. The Baltic herring has a specific name in many local languages (Swedish strömming, Finnish silakka, Estonian räim, silk, Livonian siļk, Russian салака, Polish śledź bałtycki, Latvian reņģes, Lithuanian strimelė) and is popularly and in cuisine considered distinct from herring. For example, the Swedish dish surströmming is made from Baltic herring.

Fisheries for Baltic herring have been at unsustainable levels since the Middle Ages. Around this time, the primary Baltic herring catch consisted of an autumn-spawning population. Cooling in the mid-16th century related to the Little Ice Age, combined with this overfishing, led to a dramatic loss of productivity in the population of autumn-spawning herring that rendered it nearly extinct. Due to this, the autumn-spawning herring were largely replaced by a spring-spawning population, which has since comprised most of the Baltic herring fisheries; this population is also at risk of overfishing.

Life cycle 
Herrings reach sexual maturity when they are 3 to 5 years old. The life expectancy once mature is 12 to 16 years. Atlantic herring may have different spawning components within a single stock which spawn during different seasons. They spawn in estuaries, coastal waters or in offshore banks. Fertilization is external like with most other fish, the female releases between 20,000 and 40,000 eggs and the males simultaneously release masses of milt so that they mix freely in the sea. Once fertilized the 1 to 1.4 mm diameter eggs sinks to the sea bed where its sticky surface adheres to gravel or weed and will mature in 1–3 weeks, in 14-19 °C water it takes 6–8 days, in 7,5 °C it takes 17 days. It will only mature if its temperature stays below 19 °C. The hatched larvae are 3 to 4 mm long and transparent except for the eyes which have some pigmentation.

Population  
Herrings are most seen in the North Atlantic Ocean, from the coast of South Carolina until Greenland, and from the Baltic Sea until Novaya Zemlya. In the North Sea people can distinguish four different main populations. The different herring families are spawning in different periods:

 The Buchan-Shetland-herrings spawns in August and September near the Scottish and Shetland coasts.
 On the Dogger Bank spawns the herrings from August until October.  
 The more south population will spawn later, from November until January. These are the herrings from the Southern Bight of Downs.
 The Soused herring spawns every spring in the Baltic Sea, and travels via Skagerrak to the North Sea.

These four populations lives outside of the spawn season interchangeably. In their spawn season, each population gathers together on their own spawn grounds.

In the past, there was another fifth distinct population, the Zuiderzee herring who spawned in the formerly Zuiderzee. This population disappeared when the Zuiderzee was drained by the Dutch as part of the larger Zuiderzee Works.

Ecology
Herring-like fish are the most important fish group on the planet. They are also the most populous fish. They are the dominant converter of zooplankton into fish, consuming copepods, arrow worms chaetognatha, pelagic amphipods hyperiidae, mysids and krill in the pelagic zone. Conversely, they are a central prey item or forage fish for higher trophic levels. The reasons for this success are still enigmatic; one speculation attributes their dominance to the huge, extremely fast cruising schools they inhabit.

Orca, cod, dolphins, porpoises, sharks, rockfish, seabirds, whales, squid, sea lions, seals, tuna, salmon, and fishermen are among the predators of these fishes.

Herring's pelagic–prey includes copepods (e.g. Centropagidae, Calanus spp., Acartia spp., Temora spp.), amphipods like Hyperia spp., larval snails, diatoms by larvae below , peridinians, molluscan larvae, fish eggs, krill like Meganyctiphanes norvegica, mysids, small fishes, menhaden larvae, pteropods, annelids, tintinnids by larvae below , Haplosphaera, Pseudocalanus.

Schooling

Atlantic herring can school in immense numbers. Radakov estimated herring schools in the North Atlantic can occupy up to 4.8 cubic kilometres with fish densities between 0.5 and 1.0 fish/cubic metre, equivalent to several billion fish in one school.

Herring are amongst the most spectacular schoolers ("obligate schoolers" under older terminology). They aggregate in groups that consist of thousands to hundreds of thousands or even millions of individuals. The schools traverse the open oceans.

Schools have a very precise spatial arrangement that allows the school to maintain a relatively constant cruising speed. Schools from an individual stock generally travel in a triangular pattern between their spawning grounds, e.g. Southern Norway, their feeding grounds (Iceland) and their nursery grounds (Northern Norway). Such wide triangular journeys are probably important because feeding herrings cannot distinguish their own offspring. They have excellent hearing, and a school can react very quickly to evade predators. Herring schools keep a certain distance from a moving scuba diver or a cruising predator like a killer whale, forming a vacuole which looks like a doughnut from a spotter plane. The phenomenon of schooling is far from understood, especially the implications on swimming and feeding-energetics. Many hypotheses have been put forward to explain the function of schooling,  such as predator confusion, reduced risk of being found, better orientation, and synchronized hunting. However, schooling has disadvantages such as: oxygen- and food-depletion and excretion buildup in the breathing media. The school-array probably gives advantages in energy saving although this is a highly controversial and much debated field.

Schools of herring can on calm days sometimes be detected at the surface from more than a mile away by the little waves they form, or from a few meters at night when they trigger bioluminescence in surrounding plankton ("firing").

Relationship with humans

Fisheries

The Atlantic herring fishery is managed by multiple organizations that work together on the rules and regulations applying to herring. As of 2010 the species was not threatened by overfishing.

They are an important bait fish for recreational fishermen.

Aquariums
Because of their feeding habits, cruising desire, collective behavior and fragility they survive in very few aquaria worldwide despite their abundance in the ocean. Even the best facilities leave them slim and slow compared to healthy wild schools.

Notes

Other references

 
Kils, U., The ecoSCOPE and dynIMAGE: Microscale Tools for in situ Studies of Predator Prey Interactions . Arch Hydrobiol Beih 36:83-96;1992
 Atlantic herring NOAA FishWatch. Retrieved 7 November 2012.

Further reading

Bigelow, H.B., M.G. Bradbury, J.R. Dymond, J.R. Greeley, S.F. Hildebrand, G.W. Mead, R.R. Miller, L.R. Rivas, W.L. Schroeder, R.D. Suttkus and V.D. Vladykov (1963) Fishes of the western North Atlantic. Part three New Haven, Sears Found. Mar. Res., Yale Univ.
Eschmeyer, William N., ed. 1998 Catalog of Fishes Special Publication of the Center for Biodiversity Research and Information, no. 1, vol 1–3. California Academy of Sciences. San Francisco, California, USA. 2905. .
Fish, M.P. and W.H. Mowbray (1970) Sounds of Western North Atlantic fishes. A reference file of biological underwater sounds The Johns Hopkins Press, Baltimore.
Flower, S.S. (1935) Further notes on the duration of life in animals. I. Fishes: as determined by otolith and scale-readings and direct observations on living individuals Proc. Zool. Soc. London 2:265-304.
Food and Agriculture Organization (1992). FAO yearbook 1990. Fishery statistics. Catches and landings FAO Fish. Ser. (38). FAO Stat. Ser. 70:(105):647 p.
Joensen, J.S. and Å. Vedel Tåning (1970) Marine and freshwater fishes. Zoology of the Faroes LXII - LXIII, 241 p. Reprinted from,
Jonsson, G. (1992). Islenskir fiskar. Fiolvi, Reykjavik, 568 pp.
Kinzer, J. (1983) Aquarium Kiel: Beschreibungen zur Biologie der ausgestellten Tierarten. Institut für Meereskunde an der Universität Kiel. pag. var.
Koli, L. (1990) Suomen kalat. [Fishes of Finland] Werner Söderström Osakeyhtiö. Helsinki. 357 p. (in Finnish).
Laffaille, P., E. Feunteun and J.C. Lefeuvre (2000) Composition of fish communities in a European macrotidal salt marsh (the Mont Saint-Michel Bay, France) Estuar. Coast. Shelf Sci. 51(4):429-438.
Landbrugs -og Fiskeriministeriet. (1995). Fiskeriårbogen 1996 Årbog for den danske fiskerflåde Fiskeriårbogens Forlag ved Iver C. Weilbach & Co A/S, Toldbodgade 35, Postbox 1560, DK-1253 København K, Denmark. p 333–338, 388, 389 (in Danish).
Linnaeus, C. (1758) Systema Naturae per Regna Tria Naturae secundum Classes, Ordinus, Genera, Species cum Characteribus, Differentiis Synonymis, Locis 10th ed., Vol. 1. Holmiae Salvii. 824 p.
Munroe, Thomas, A. / Collette, Bruce B., and Grace Klein-MacPhee, eds. 2002 Herrings: Family Clupeidae. Bigelow and Schroeder's Fishes of the Gulf of Maine, Third Edition. Smithsonian Institution Press. Washington, DC, USA. 111–160. .
Murdy, Edward O., Ray S. Birdsong, and John A. Musick 1997 Fishes of Chesapeake Bay Smithsonian Institution Press. Washington, DC, USA. xi + 324. .
Muus, B., F. Salomonsen and C. Vibe (1990) Grønlands fauna (Fisk, Fugle, Pattedyr) Gyldendalske Boghandel, Nordisk Forlag A/S København, 464 p. (in Danish).
Muus, B.J. and J.G. Nielsen (1999) Sea fish. Scandinavian Fishing Year Book Hedehusene, Denmark. 340 p.
Muus, B.J. and P. Dahlström (1974) Collins guide to the sea fishes of Britain and North-Western Europe Collins, London, UK. 244 p.
 Reid RN, Cargnelli LM, Griesbach SJ, Packer DB, Johnson DL, Zetlin CA, Morse WW and Berrien PL (1999) Atlantic Herring, Clupea harengus, Life History and Habitat Characteristics NOAA Technical Memorandum NMFS-NE-126, NOAA.
Robins, Richard C., Reeve M. Bailey, Carl E. Bond, James R. Brooker, Ernest A. Lachner, et al. 1991 Common and Scientific Names of Fishes from the United States and Canada, Fifth Edition. American Fisheries Society Special Publication, no. 20. American Fisheries Society. Bethesda, Maryland, USA. 183. .
Robins, Richard C., Reeve M. Bailey, Carl E. Bond, James R. Brooker, Ernest A. Lachner, et al. 1991 Common and Scientific Names of Fishes from the United States and Canada, Fifth Edition. American Fisheries Society Special Publication, no. 20. American Fisheries Society. Bethesda, Maryland, USA. 183. .
Whitehead, Peter J. P. 1985. Clupeoid Fishes of the World (Suborder Clupeoidei): An Annotated and Illustrated Catalogue of the Herrings, Sardines, Pilchards, Sprats, Shads, Anchovies and Wolf-herrings: Part 1 - Chirocentridae, Clupeidae and Pristigasteridae FAO Fisheries Synopsis, no. 125, vol. 7, pt. 1. Food and Agriculture Organization of the United Nations. Rome, Italy. x + 303. .

External links
Information on Fishbase
Information on clupea.de
Atlantic herring (Clupea harengus) pages on Gulf of Maine Research Institute

Atlantic herrin
Fish of the North Atlantic
Fish of Europe
Fauna of Atlantic Canada
Fauna of the Northeastern United States
Commercial fish
Atlantic herrin
Atlantic herrin